WTZE is a Christian Rock-formatted broadcast radio station licensed to Tazewell, Virginia, serving Tazewell and Tazewell County, Virginia. WTZE is owned and operated by CSN International.

History
WTZE was purchased by Calvary Chapel of Twin Falls, Inc. on May 7, 2013.  WTZE dropped its Talk format for a simulcast of KEFX's "Effect Radio" network.

The station was previously owned by Triad Broadcasting Company, LLC.  Prior to its current format, the station aired a Talk format and was a simulcast of WHIS.

References

External links
 The Effect Online

Radio stations established in 1966
1966 establishments in Virginia
TZE
TZE